Sikalikul (Hikälekül) is a rural locality (a village) in Ismailovsky Selsoviet, Dyurtyulinsky District, Bashkortostan, Russia. The population was 170 as of 2010. There is 1 street.

Geography 
Sikalikul is located 27 km northwest of Dyurtyuli (the district's administrative centre) by road. Telepanovo is the nearest rural locality.

References 

Rural localities in Dyurtyulinsky District